Silver Falls School District is a school district in the U.S. State of Oregon that serves the communities of Scotts Mills and Silverton in Marion County and Clackamas County, as well as the surrounding foothills along Silver Creek and the Abiqua River up to Silver Falls State Park. The current Interim Superintendent is Paul Peterson.

School board
Board officers are elected annually, and terms begin and end during summer break. Terms last for four years, and elections are staggered so that no more than four positions become open at a time.

Board members
Janet Allanach, Zone 1
Owen Von Flue, Zone 2
Lori McLaughlin, Zone 3
Jennifer Traeger, Zone 4 Vice Chair person
Aaron Koch, Zone 5
Jonathan Edmonds, Zone 6 Chair person
Tom Bucholz, Zone 7

Demographics
In the 2017-18 school year, the district had 3,881 students. Of those students, 80% were white, 3% multiracial, 1% American Indian, Asian, Black or Native Hawaiian, 15% were Hispanic, and 12% classified as Ever English Learners, there were 16 languages spoken and 14% of students had disabilities, 37% of students received free or reduced price lunch according to the Department of Education.

Schools
There are currently thirteen schools in the district.

Elementary schools
Bethany Charter Elementary (K-8)
Butte Creek Elementary (K-8)
Central Howell Elementary (K-8)
Community Roots Montessori Charter (K-8)
Evergreen Elementary (K-8)
Mark Twain Elementary (K-2)
Pratum Elementary (K-8)
Robert Frost Elementary (3-5)
Scotts Mills Elementary (K-8)
Silver Crest Elementary (K-8)
Silverton Middle School (6-8)
Victor Point Elementary (K-8)

High school
Silverton High School

References

External links

 
Education in Marion County, Oregon
School districts in Oregon
Education in Clackamas County, Oregon